The Pârâul Chintenilor (also: Chinteni) is a left tributary of the river Someșul Mic in Romania. It discharges into the Someșul Mic in Cluj-Napoca.

References

Rivers of Romania
Rivers of Cluj County